Letterkenny Athletic Club (LAC) is an Irish athletic club, which has produced several Olympians. Based at Aura Sports Complex in Letterkenny, County Donegal, it has a Tartan 400m running track.

History
Letterkenny Athletic Club was formed in 1972. Since it has evolved into one of the leading athletic clubs in Donegal and throughout Ireland. It is one of the biggest clubs in the North-West with a current membership of over 150 juvenile and 100 senior athletes.

LAC takes part in cross-country, road running and track and field competitions. Over the years, the club has had successes at all levels of competition.

Notable members
 Gary Crossan — marathon runner
 Mark English — middle-distance runner; Olympian
 Danny McDaid — marathon runner; Olympian
 Danny Mooney — middle-distance runner; competed at the 2014 Commonwealth Games
 Caolan Ward — Gaelic footballer

References

External links
 Official website 

Athletics clubs in Ireland
Organisations based in Letterkenny
Sport in Letterkenny
Sports clubs established in 1972
Sports clubs in County Donegal